Kabosu (カボス or 臭橙; binomial name: Citrus sphaerocarpa) is a citrus fruit of an evergreen broad-leaf tree in the family Rutaceae. It is popular in Japan, where its juice is used to improve the taste of many dishes, especially cooked fish, sashimi, and hot pot dishes.

Characteristics

Kabosu is a juicy citrus fruit closely related to yuzu. Its juice has the sharpness of lemon, and it is used instead of vinegar in some Japanese dishes. It grows on a flowering tree with sharp thorns. The fruit is harvested when still green, but if left to ripen it turns yellow. It is often confused with similar citrus such as sudachi, but can easily be distinguished by the apex of the fruit where the pistil has fallen off, which is a slightly raised torus shape.

Origin
Thought to be an ichang papeda – bitter orange hybrid, the kabosu was brought over from China in the Edo period and became a popular fruit in Japan. It is produced in most areas of Ōita Prefecture, particularly in Taketa and Usuki. In Usuki, there used to be a 300-year-old tree, and 200-year-old trees still exist there.

Usage
Kabosu juice is rich in sourness, with a unique fragrance. It is used with sashimi, grilled fish, ponzu for hot pot, and as a vinegar alternative for Japanese dishes. In Ōita Prefecture it is also used with miso soup, noodles, and shōchū, by adding the juice for flavoring. Squeezing vertically cut radial quarters with the peel side down prevents the seeds from entering the dish or cup while adding the juice. Kabosu juice is used in a wide range of products including condiments, juices, non-alcoholic beverages, frozen desserts, snack foods, wagashi, pastries, and alcoholic beverages.

When mixed in fish feed, the polyphenols in kabosu prevent discoloration and odor in fish meat for longer time periods. Japanese amberjack (buri) and Summer flounder (hirame) grown using this feed are marketed as Kabosu Buri and Kabosu Hirame in Ōita Prefecture.

Production
National Japanese production in 2007 was 5,185 tons. Prefecture-specific production volumes that year were 5,019 tons in Ōita Prefecture, 144 tons in Aichi Prefecture, and 17 tons in Miyazaki Prefecture, and volume in the main producing district of Ōita Prefecture was 97% of national production. There are good and bad years for Kabosu production; 2009 was a good year and the volume in Ōita Prefecture was about 6,587 tons. The annual production in Ōita Prefecture was 3,623 tons in 2010, and 5,273 tons in 2011. The main cities producing Kabosu are Usuki, Ōita; Taketa, Ōita; Bungo-ōno, Ōita; and Kunisaki, Ōita.

Character
A kabosu-motif mascot character called Kabotan was created for the National Greening Fair held in Ōita in 2003. The Ōita Kabosu  promotion council chose this character as the mascot for "Ōita Kabosu" after the fair. In 2005, Kabotan's use was extended to regional development in general in Ōita Prefecture, even beyond Kabosu production.

The Shiba Inu used in the Doge meme is named Kabosu, as her owner thought she had a round face like the fruit.

See also
Yuukou
Yuzu
Jabara (citrus)

References

External links
Ōita Kabosu - Official site

Citrus hybrids
Japanese fruit
Fruits originating in East Asia